{{DISPLAYTITLE:C22H24O2}}
The molecular formula C22H24O2 may refer to:

 (R,R)-Tetrahydrochrysene, a drug used to study estrogen receptors in scientific research
 (S,S)-Tetrahydrochrysene, a steroid-like nonsteroidal estrogen and agonist of both the estrogen receptors